The Nooseneck River is a river in the U.S. state of Rhode Island. There are three dams along the river's length.

Course
The river rises on the south side of Hammitt Hill in Coventry, then flows southeast through West Greenwich where it converges with the Congdon River to form the Big River.

Crossings
Below is a list all crossings over the Nooseneck River. The list starts at the headwaters and goes downstream.
West Greenwich
Sharpe Street
Fry Pond Road
Interstate 95
Nooseneck Hill Road (RI 3)

Tributaries
Raccoon Brook is the Nooseneck River's only named tributary, though it has many unnamed streams that also feed it.

See also
List of rivers in Rhode Island

References
Maps from the United States Geological Survey

Rivers of Kent County, Rhode Island
West Greenwich, Rhode Island
Coventry, Rhode Island
Rivers of Rhode Island
Tributaries of Providence River